Béalencourt is a commune in the Pas-de-Calais department in the Hauts-de-France region in northern France.

Geography
A small village situated some 16 miles (26 km) east of Montreuil-sur-Mer, on the D107E road.

Population

See also
Communes of the Pas-de-Calais department

References

Communes of Pas-de-Calais
Artois